Back to Basics is the fifteenth studio album by American vocal group, The Manhattans, released in 1986 through Columbia Records.  It was the last record Gerald Alston would record with The Manhattans until he returned in 1995, and featured his duet performances with Regina Belle on the single "Where Did We Go Wrong?" and "Maybe Tomorrow", which was the B-side.

The album was produced by Leo Graham Enterprises and contained songs written and produced by Bobby Womack.  "Where Did We Go Wrong?" was produced by Bobby Womack and written by Kathy Bloxson aka Sasha, who worked with Womack as his background vocalist on two albums in the early '80's. Joe McEwen and Mickey Eichner were executive producers.

Track listing

Critical response 
Ron Wynn of allmusic.com wrote:  "The Manhattans tried to return to the soul form of past years with this mid-'80s release. It contained songs written and produced by the great Bobby Womack and less pop/crossover arrangements and influences. Gerald Alston was preparing to leave the group, but still sang with his customary warmth and style. But the person who made the most impact on this album was new co-vocalist Regina Belle..."

References

External links 
 Where Did We Go Wrong? on YouTube
 Maybe Tomorrow on YouTube

1986 albums
The Manhattans albums
albums produced by Bobby Womack
Columbia Records albums